The X-Files is an American science fiction–supernatural television series that originally aired on the Fox network for 9 seasons from September 10, 1993, to May 19, 2002. The series centers on FBI special agents Fox Mulder (David Duchovny) and Dana Scully (Gillian Anderson), who work on cases linked to the paranormal, called X-Files. Mulder, an FBI profiler, is a believer in the paranormal, and the skeptical Scully, a medical doctor, is assigned to make scientific analyses of Mulder's discoveries which could ultimately be used to discredit his work. Throughout the series the two develop a close friendship. During the eighth and ninth seasons of the series, Duchovny's role was reduced from lead actor to an intermittent lead role.

The show's premise originated with Chris Carter, who served as an executive producer along with R. W. Goodwin, Frank Spotnitz, Howard Gordon, Vince Gilligan, John Shiban, Kim Manners, Glen Morgan, James Wong, and many others. Filming for seasons one to five took place primarily in Vancouver, British Columbia, and for the remaining seasons in Los Angeles. Episodes were broadcast on Fridays at 9:00 pm Eastern Time for the series' first three seasons; the remaining six seasons aired on Sundays at 9:00 pm Eastern Time. Episodes are approximately 45 minutes in length (not including commercials) and were broadcast in standard definition. Two feature films based on the television series have been released as part of The X-Files franchise: the first premiered in summer 1998, between seasons five and six of the series, and a post-series film, The X-Files: I Want to Believe, was released in 2008. On March 24, 2015, Fox officially announced the series would return for a six-episode tenth season, which aired in 2016. On April 20, 2017, Fox officially announced The X-Files would be returning for an eleventh season of ten episodes, which premiered on January 3, 2018. 

Many mythology collections of The X-Files episodes have been released on DVD. Since 2000, 20th Century Fox Home Entertainment has distributed all seasons on DVD, and episodes are also available for download at the iTunes Store and Amazon Video, and are available for streaming on Hulu. The show's episodes have won a number of awards, including three Golden Globe Awards for Best Drama Series and a Satellite Award for Best Drama Series. Various cast members' performances have been praised by critics, particularly those of Duchovny and Anderson.

Series overview

Episodes 
Episodes marked with a double dagger are episodes in the series' alien mythology arc.

Season 1 (1993–94)

Season 2 (1994–95)

Season 3 (1995–96)

Season 4 (1996–97)

Season 5 (1997–98)

The X-Files (1998)

Season 6 (1998–99)

Season 7 (1999–2000)

Season 8 (2000–01)

Season 9 (2001–02)

The X-Files: I Want to Believe (2008)

Season 10 (2016)

Season 11 (2018)

See also

Notes

References

Bibliography

External links 

 
 
 

X-Files
X Files
 
Episodes